Abd Rani bin Osman (14 April 1958 – 23 January 2023) was a Malaysian politician who served as Member of the Selangor State Assembly for Meru from 2008 to 2018.  A member of the Malaysian Islamic Party (PAS), a component of Perikatan Nasional (PN) coalition. He died from heart disease on 23 January 2023, at the age of 64.

Election results

References 

1958 births
2023 deaths
People from Selangor
Malaysian Muslims
Malaysian Islamic Party politicians
Members of the Selangor State Legislative Assembly
21st-century Malaysian politicians